Freda Love Smith (born Freda Boner, later used the stage name Freda Love) is an American musician, journalist, and non-fiction author.  Smith is known as a drummer and vocalist for several alternative rock bands, including the Blake Babies, Antenna, Mysteries of Life, Some Girls and Sunshine Boys.  She is the author of Red Velvet Underground, a memoir and cookbook published in 2015.

Smith attended Indiana University, where she earned her Bachelor of Arts degree in general studies.  She also earned a Master of Arts degree from Nottingham Trent University in creative writing. Smith was a lecturer and undergraduate advisor for the Northwestern University Department of Radio/Television/Film until 2022.

References

External links
Freda Love Smith at the Northwestern University School of Communication

American drummers
American non-fiction writers
Indiana University alumni
Alumni of Nottingham Trent University
Living people
Year of birth missing (living people)
American women non-fiction writers
21st-century American women